Geromyia is a genus of flies belonging to the family Cecidomyiidae.

The species of this genus are found in Western Africa.

Species:

Geromyia akolaensis 
Geromyia penniseti

References

Cecidomyiidae
Insects described in 1969